Anokha Bandhan ( Unique Relation) is a 1982 Hindi-language drama film, produced by Ratan Irani under the Shree Jagdamba Movies banner and directed by Mehul Kumar. It stars Ashok Kumar, Shabana Azmi, Navin Nischol, Master Bittu  while Jeetendra has given a Special Appearance and music composed by Usha Khanna. The film remade as Telugu movie Vadina Maata (1992).

The film is based on Sharat Chandra Chatterji's book Ramer Sumati (1914).

Plot
The film begins in a village where Shyamlal is a trustworthy employee of the Zamindar. He lives with his ideal wife Annapurna / Anu. Before dying, his stepmother entrusts the responsibility of her son Ram to the couple. Despite having a child Gopal Anu dotes on Ram as ever, and he too adores her. Ram perturbs everyone with his naught deeds which Anu covers up. Moreover, he always confronts Chote Babu a haughty grandson of Zamindar. Meanwhile, the virago mother of Anu arrives and creates disputes and distance between Anu & Ram. Once, Chote Babu degrades Ram and he hits him hard. Then, Zamindar rebukes Shyamlal, as annoyed he separates Ram from the house by giving his share. The incident makes a severe impact on Anu and she becomes terminally ill. However, Ram recovers her with his idolization. At last, they expel the old cat. Finally, the movie ends on a happy note with the reunion of the family.

Cast
 Ashok Kumar as Zamindar
 Jeetendra as Haribabu (Guest)
 Shabana Azmi as Annapurna / Anu
 Navin Nischol as Shyamlal
 Satyendra Kapoor as Doctor
 Jagdeep as Kalyanjibhai Bhojwala
 Mukri as Kalumali
 Shekhar Purohit
 Aruna Irani as Kalyanji's wife
 Shashikala as Anu's mom
 Seema Deo as Ram's mom
 Annapurna Shukla
 Rehana Jariwala
 Master Bittu as Ram

Soundtrack

References

External links

1980s Hindi-language films
Films scored by Usha Khanna
Indian drama films
Films directed by Mehul Kumar
1982 drama films
1982 films
Hindi-language drama films